The Holderness School is a private, coeducational college-preparatory school in Holderness, near Plymouth, New Hampshire in the United States. The student body of 300 is drawn from 22 U.S. states and 14 foreign countries. While Holderness operates primarily as a boarding school, it also enrolls 25 day students. John McVeigh is currently Holderness School's 10th Head of School (headmaster). McVeigh's predecessor was R. Phillip Peck, M.Ed.  In the summer the campus is used as a site for various Gordon Research Conferences.

History

Founded in 1879 under the auspices of the Episcopal Diocese of New Hampshire, the school retains some links with the denomination, but now conducts ecumenical chapel services and welcomes applicants of all faiths.

Location
The school is on high ground on the east side of the Pemigewasset River in Holderness overlooking the town of Plymouth, population about 6,000, and home of Plymouth State University and Speare Memorial Hospital. Access to Interstate 93 is within sight of the campus.

Facilities
Holderness School's  of land contains academic buildings, an outdoor covered ice rink, eight playing fields, 10 tennis courts, and 10 kilometers of cross-country trails. In the past few years, the school has built a new library and health center, a new dining hall, two state of the art residential facilities, and a brand new, modern Math and Science center. The school has plans for greater improvements to the rink, an updated Athletics Center, and a student life facility centering on the school's historic chapel.

Special programs
The freshman class participates in Project Outreach, a community service project.  Artward Bound offers sophomores a 10-day program of intensive study with professional artists in disciplines such as glass-blowing, blacksmithing, African dance, and stand-up comedy.  The "Out Back" program is a cornerstone of life at Holderness.  In Out Back, juniors trek in the woods for 11 days in a winter expedition all while, keeping a personal journal, learning and living together and experiencing a three days solo.  Seniors complete a Senior Thesis which is a year-long experiential learning project culminating in a presentation and project.

Notable alumni

 William Drea Adams, Chairman of the National Endowment of the Humanities
 Charles Bass, New Hampshire congressman
 Olin Browne, pro golfer
 Kyle Carey, Celtic American musician
 Robert Creeley, poet
 Chris Davenport, ski mountaineer and film star
 Angel Del Villar II, the rapper Homeboy Sandman
 Nat Faxon, screenwriter, actor and comedian
 Jeremy Foley, University of Florida athletic director
 Julia Ford, member of the 2014 U.S. Alpine Ski Team
 Tyler Hamilton, professional racing cyclist
 Brette Harrington, alpinist
 Jed Hoyer, General Manager of the Chicago Cubs
 Steve Jones, a founder of Teton Gravity Research
 Nikki Kimball, ultramarathoner
 Glenn D. Lowry, Director, Museum of Modern Art
 Brett Lunger, race car driver
 Montgomery Meigs, retired United States Army general
 Terence Mitchell, British museum curator 
 Tyler Palmer, Olympic skier
 Martynas Pocius, professional basketball player
 Gavin Bayreuther, professional hockey player for the Columbus Blue Jackets
 Freddy Hall, professional soccer player
 Gabriel Sherman, journalist and author
 Maggie Shnayerson, journalist and blogger
 Thomas Antonucci, renowned history teacher at The Taft School

References

External links
 Holderness School Official website

Boarding schools in New Hampshire
Educational institutions established in 1879
Preparatory schools in New Hampshire
Private high schools in New Hampshire
Schools in Grafton County, New Hampshire
1879 establishments in New Hampshire
Holderness, New Hampshire